General elections were held in Kenya on 29 December 1992. Voters elected the President, and members of the National Assembly. They were the first multi-party general elections in Kenya since independence and the first to feature a direct vote for the President, who had, in 1964, been elected by the National Assembly, and, following a 1969 constitutional amendment, been automatically declared winner of non-held popular elections, held alongside parliamentary elections, in 1969, 1974, 1979, 1983, and 1988.

The results were marred by allegations of large-scale intimidation of opponents, harassment of election officials, and ballot-box stuffing, as well as targeted ethnic violence in the Rift Valley Province. Human Rights Watch accused several prominent Kenyan politicians, including President Daniel arap Moi and then-VP George Saitoti of inciting and co-ordinating the violence.  Voter turnout was 69.4%.

Background
In 1991, Kenya transitioned to a multiparty political system after 26 years of single-party rule under KANU. On 28 October 1992, president Moi dissolved parliament, five months before the end of his term. As a result, preparations began for all elective seats in parliament as well as the president. The elections were scheduled to take place on 7 December 1992, but delays led to its postponement to 29 December the same year.

Results

President

By province

National Assembly
Following the elections, Moi nominated a further 12 KANU members to the National Assembly.

Aftermath
In the aftermath of the election, Kenya suffered an economic crisis propagated by ethnic violence as the president was accused of rigging electoral results to retain power. In the next five years, many political alliances were formed in preparation for the next elections. In 1994, Jaramogi Oginga Odinga died and several coalitions joined his FORD Kenya party to form a new party called United National Democratic Alliance. However, this party was plagued with disagreements. In 1996, KANU revised the constitution to allow Moi to remain president for another term.

In 1993 Kenneth Matiba filed a petition against the election results. However, his failure to personally sign the petition resulted in the petition being struck out by Justice Riaga Omolo. Matiba, was physically incapacitated and had given his wife power of attorney. In 2012, Justice Omolo was declared unfit to serve in the judiciary by the Judges and Magistrates Vetting Board over this decision.

References

Elections in Kenya
General
Kenya
National Assembly (Kenya)
Presidential elections in Kenya
Election and referendum articles with incomplete results
Kenya

de:Parlamentswahlen in Kenia 1992